"Silenced by the Night" is a song by English rock band Keane from their fourth studio album Strangeland. It was released worldwide as the album's lead single on 13 March 2012, except for the United Kingdom where it was released on 13 April 2012. The song was written by Tim Rice-Oxley, Tom Chaplin, Richard Hughes, Jesse Quin and produced by Dan Grech-Marguerat.

Release
"Silenced by the Night" was originally only to be released as a commercial single in the United States. However, the single was released in other international markets on 13 March 2012. In the United Kingdom, the single was released on 13 April 2012.

Music video
A music video to accompany the release of "Silenced by the Night" was first released onto Vevo on YouTube on 4 April 2012 at a total length of three minutes and thirty-one seconds.

The song's music video, which is directed by Christopher Sims, was shot at a lime salt mine in Austin, Texas. It depicts a couple making a road trip across the US.

Live performances
Keane performed the song for the first time on 12 March on American talk show Jimmy Kimmel Live!.

Track listing

Charts

Radio and release history

References

Keane (band) songs
2012 singles
Songs written by Tim Rice-Oxley
Songs written by Tom Chaplin
Songs written by Richard Hughes (musician)
Songs written by Jesse Quin
Rock ballads
2012 songs
Island Records singles